A steeplejack is a craftsman who is prepared to scale tall buildings and in particular church steeples to carry out general repairs.

Steeplejack may also refer to:

 Steeplejack Industrial, a Canadian scaffolding and industrial services company
 Steeplejack (Marvel Comics), a Marvel Comics character
 "Steeplejack" Charles Miller (1882-1910), American climber